Bruno Soriano Llido (born 12 June 1984) is a Spanish former professional footballer who played as a defensive midfielder.

He spent his entire career with Villarreal since making his first appearance with the first team in 2006, and played 425 official games for them. He missed nearly three whole seasons in his later career, due to injury.

Soriano made his debut for Spain in 2010, and represented the nation at Euro 2016.

Club career
Born in Artana, Province of Castellón, Valencian Community, Soriano joined Villarreal CF's youth system at the age of 13, but left the club four years later to return to his hometown. He then played for local side Artana CF in the regional leagues before returning to Villarreal in 2003, where he featured for the third and second teams.

Soriano made his debut for the first team on 15 July 2006, in a 1–2 home loss to NK Maribor in the UEFA Intertoto Cup. His La Liga occurred on 1 October, in a 2–1 away win against RCD Mallorca.

Soriano made a permanent switch to the main squad in 2007–08, and was a regular fixture in the side's callups throughout the season, though not a regular starter. On 14 November 2007, he scored his first professional goal, in a 4–2 victory at UD Las Palmas in the round of 32 of the Copa del Rey; he had the same status the following year, as the Yellow Submarine qualified for the UEFA Europa League in fifth place.

In 2009–10, Soriano became first-choice for Villarreal, finally winning the battle for starting duties over Uruguayan Sebastián Eguren. He only missed one game in 38 the following campaign, with the club finishing fourth and returning to the UEFA Champions League.

In the 2012 off-season, shortly after suffering relegation, Soriano received a €9 million offer from neighbouring Valencia CF, which he rejected in order to stay and help achieve promotion, also signing a new four-year contract until 2020. In 2013–14, with Villarreal back in the top flight, he scored a career-best six goals – three through penalty kicks – to help his team finish in sixth position and qualify to the Europa League.

On 31 December 2015, Soriano netted through a superbly taken free kick to help defeat Valencia 1–0 at the Estadio El Madrigal. The following matchday, he scored both of his team's goals in 2–1 away win against Deportivo de La Coruña, the second coming through an injury-time penalty.

Soriano spent the 2017–18 and 2018–19 seasons and most of 2019–20 on the sidelines, due to a knee injury. He finally made his return against Sevilla FC, on 22 June 2020. 

On 19 July 2020, aged 36, Soriano retired from football.

International career
On 5 August 2010, Vicente del Bosque named Soriano as one of the three new players for the Spanish team after the victorious FIFA World Cup in South Africa, for a friendly with Mexico. He made his debut on the 11th, playing 61 minutes in the 1–1 draw in Mexico City.

On 17 May 2016, Soriano was included in a provisional squad of 25 for the UEFA Euro 2016 tournament, and also made the final list. He made his debut in the competition on 17 June at the age of 32, coming on as a 64th-minute substitute for David Silva in a 3–0 group stage win against Turkey at the Allianz Riviera.

Career statistics

Club

International

See also
List of one-club men

References

External links

Villarreal official profile 

1984 births
Living people
People from Plana Baixa
Sportspeople from the Province of Castellón
Spanish footballers
Footballers from the Valencian Community
Association football midfielders
La Liga players
Segunda División players
Tercera División players
Divisiones Regionales de Fútbol players
Villarreal CF C players
Villarreal CF B players
Villarreal CF players
Spain international footballers
UEFA Euro 2016 players